Abdulrahman Al-Rashidi may refer to:
 Abdulrahman Al-Rashidi (Qatari footballer) (born 1994) 
 Abdulrahman Al-Rashidi (Saudi footballer) (born 1992)